Zhigalovo is the name of several inhabited localities in Russia.

Urban localities
Zhigalovo, Irkutsk Oblast, a work settlement in Zhigalovsky District of Irkutsk Oblast

Rural localities
Zhigalovo, Moscow Oblast, a village in Lunevskoye Rural Settlement of Solnechnogorsky District of Moscow Oblast
Zhigalovo, Pochinkovsky District, Smolensk Oblast, a village in Vaskovskoye Rural Settlement of Pochinkovsky District of Smolensk Oblast
Zhigalovo, Velizhsky District, Smolensk Oblast, a village in Seleznevskoye Rural Settlement of Velizhsky District of Smolensk Oblast
Zhigalovo, Vladimir Oblast, a village in Gus-Khrustalny District of Vladimir Oblast